Jones County is the name of six counties in the United States:
 Jones County, Georgia 
 Jones County, Iowa 
 Jones County, Mississippi 
 Jones County, North Carolina 
 Jones County, South Dakota 
 Jones County, Texas

It was also the former name of two Alabama counties:
 Lamar County, Alabama.  Established as Jones County on February 4, 1867, re-established as Sanford County on October 8, 1868, and renamed Lamar County on February 8, 1877.
 Covington County, Alabama.  Renamed Jones County on August 6, 1868, the original name of Covington was restored on October 10, 1868.